The Saint Louis University-International School of Medicine is one of the nine academic units of Saint Louis University, a private, Roman Catholic, CICM university in the Philippines. It is housed at Dr. Jose Rizal Building inside the SLU Main campus adjacent to its partner hospital, the Saint Louis University-Hospital of the Sacred Heart founded a year after the school's foundation in 1976.

The school is the first and by far the only medical school in the Cordillera region. Over the years, the school earned accolades for its meritorious performance in the licensure exams, with a “high” performance level (often garnering 1st or 2nd place) as cited by the Philippine Association of Board Examiners. It maintains a roster of highly qualified faculty members who are recognized in their respective medical specializations.

Just recently, the SLU-International School of Medicine received an Award of Excellence from the Philippine Regulatory Commission and the Board of Medicine for its excellent performance as a top performing school during the August 2011 Physician Licensure Examination.

Program
Doctor of Medicine (MD)

References

External links

Medical schools in the Philippines
Saint Louis University